The 2006 FIFA World Player of the Year prize was awarded to the Italian Fabio Cannavaro for the first time. He finished ahead of retired midfielder Zinédine Zidane, who won the Golden Ball at the World Cup and the winner of the 2005 FIFA World Player of the Year Ronaldinho in the final round of voting.

The female FIFA soccer player of the year was Marta.

Results

Men

Women

See also

References

FIFA World Player of the Year
FIFA World Player of the Year winners